Matthew John Kata (born March 14, 1978) is an American former professional baseball infielder. He played in Major League Baseball (MLB) for the Arizona Diamondbacks, Philadelphia Phillies, Texas Rangers, Pittsburgh Pirates, and Houston Astros.

Career
Kata graduated from St. Ignatius High School in Cleveland, Ohio in 1996 and attended college at Vanderbilt University. In 1997 and 1998, he played collegiate summer baseball with the Chatham A's of the Cape Cod Baseball League. He was selected by Arizona in the ninth round of the 1999 Major League Baseball Draft and made his major league debut for the Diamondbacks June 15, .

Along with Robby Hammock, Alex Cintrón and Brandon Webb, he was one of the "Baby Backs" who were called up when a surge of injuries hit Diamondbacks veteran players in 2003. The Baby Backs were popular and contributed to a winning season, but ultimately failed to make the playoffs.

Kata was signed to a minor league contract by the Texas Rangers in November 2006
and was a non-roster invitee to their 2007 spring training camp. He earned a spot on the team's opening day roster as a utility player.
He appeared in 31 games for Texas, batting .186, before he was designated for assignment June 5 when the Rangers activated pitcher John Rheinecker and infielder/outfielder Jerry Hairston Jr. from the disabled list.
After clearing waivers, he signed a minor league contract with Pittsburgh on June 15 and was recalled by the Pirates June 30. Kata became a free agent after the season.

On December 21, 2007, the Colorado Rockies signed Kata to a minor league contract with an invitation to spring training. Kata did not make the team and opted for free agency.

On March 30, Kata rejoined the Pittsburgh Pirates organization by signing a minor league contract. He became a free agent at the end of the season and signed a minor league contract with the Houston Astros, and appeared in 40 games for the Astros in 2009; he spent the entire 2010 season with their Round Rock, Texas AAA affiliate.

Since signing a minor-league contract with the Texas Rangers on January 13, 2011 Kata has been playing for their Pacific Coast League AAA affiliate in Round Rock, Texas (the Round Rock Express became the Texas Rangers MLB organization's AAA club prior to the 2011 season).

References

External links

1978 births
Living people
People from Fairview Park, Ohio
Major League Baseball second basemen
Baseball players from Ohio
Arizona Diamondbacks players
Philadelphia Phillies players
Texas Rangers players
Pittsburgh Pirates players
Houston Astros players
South Bend Silver Hawks players
El Paso Diablos players
Lancaster JetHawks players
Tucson Sidewinders players
Scranton/Wilkes-Barre Red Barons players
Louisville Bats players
Indianapolis Indians players
Round Rock Express players
Saint Ignatius High School (Cleveland) alumni
Vanderbilt Commodores baseball players
Chatham Anglers players
Sportspeople from Cuyahoga County, Ohio
American people of Polish descent